E82 may refer to:
 European route E82, an international road
 A model of the BMW 1 Series car
 King's Indian Defence, Sämisch Variation, Encyclopaedia of Chess Openings code
 Chiba-Tōgane Road, route E82 in Japan